Coralville Lake is an artificial lake in Johnson County, Iowa, United States, formed by the Coralville Dam, a dam built from 1949 to 1958 on the Iowa River upstream from the city of Coralville, Iowa.

History

After widespread flooding in the United States during the early 1930s, Congress passed the Flood Control Act of 1938.
The United States Army Corps of Engineers built the 100-foot-high earthen dam primarily as a flood control project for the Mississippi River. Construction started in 1949, was delayed by the Korean War, and was completed in 1958.

Floods
Water first flowed over the  emergency spillway on July 5, 1993 (see Great Flood of 1993), reaching a then-record crest. This flood uncovered what is now the Devonian Fossil Gorge.

The 1993 record was surpassed by the June 2008 Midwest floods, when water again flowed over the  emergency spillway on June 12, 2008, and the reservoir crested at  early in the morning on June 15, 2008.

Lake Macbride is formed by another dam just up from the Coralville reservoir. This dam was overtopped by floodwaters in the flood of 2008, and the lake effectively became part of Coralville Lake.

Recreation and public use
The lake and surrounding shoreline have been extensively developed for public recreational use, including hiking, biking, camping, fishing and boating. There are 11 recreation areas, 4 swimming beaches, 3 Marinas, 18 boat ramps, 3 campgrounds (total of 620 campsites), 7 large picnic shelters, 2 Disc golf courses, and 7 trails (total of 29 miles).

Photos

See also

List of dams and reservoirs in Iowa

References

External links
U.S. Army Corps of Engineers, Coralville Lake (official site)
Coralville Lake on Recreation.gov, recreation information and camping reservations

Reservoirs in Iowa
Bodies of water of Johnson County, Iowa
Tourist attractions in Johnson County, Iowa
United States Army Corps of Engineers dams
Dams in Iowa
Protected areas of Johnson County, Iowa